Šmeral is a surname. Notable people with the surname include:

 Bohumír Šmeral (1880–1941), Czech politician
 Vladimír Šmeral (1903–1982), Czech actor

Czech-language surnames